A medallion is a round or oval ornament (typically made of bronze but also made of stucco) that contains a sculptural or pictorial decoration on a façade, an interior, a monument, or a piece of furniture or equipment.

In the United Kingdom in the 19th century, this was a popular form of decoration in neoclassical architecture. The frame and portrait were carved as one, in marble for interiors, and in stone for exterior walls.

It is also the name of a scene that is inset into a larger stained glass window.

Gallery

See also
 Floor medallion
 Tondo (art): round (circular)
 Cartouche (design): oval

References

External links

Architectural elements